Haʻatoʻu is a settlement in Lifuka island, Tonga.

See also 
 List of islands and towns in Tonga

Populated places in Haʻapai